Huck's Market, formerly known as Huck's Now and more recently, Huck's Food & Fuel, is a chain of convenience stores headquartered in Carmi, Illinois operating as a subsidiary of Martin & Bayley, Inc. As of August 2018, there are over 120 Huck's stores located across Illinois, Indiana, Kentucky, Missouri and Tennessee.

Huck's was founded in 1960, beginning its existence as Big John's Supermarket, in Southern Illinois then as a supermarket chain, before becoming a chain of convenience stores in 1974, opening the first Huck's location in Grayville, Illinois. It has been an employee-owned corporation since 2001, employing over 1500 people, primarily in rural areas.

References

American companies established in 1960
Retail companies established in 1960
Convenience stores of the United States
Gas stations in the United States
Retail companies based in Illinois